Ochlodes sylvanoides, the woodland skipper, is a butterfly of the family Hesperiidae. It is found in North America from British Columbia south to southern California, east to Montana, Colorado and Arizona.

The wingspan is 25–32 mm. The upperside is orange with toothed brown borders. The forewing of the males has a black stigma, while females have or a black diagonal band. There is a large reddish patch on the hindwings. The underside is variable in colour, ranging from yellow to reddish to brown. The hindwing varies from unmarked to having a distinct band of cream to yellow spots. Adults feed on flower nectar.

The larvae feed on various Poaceae species, including Cynodon dactylon, Phalaris, Elymus and  Agropyron species.

Subspecies
Ochlodes sylvanoides sylvanoides (California, Mexico)
Ochlodes sylvanoides pratincola (Boisduval, 1852)
Ochlodes sylvanoides napa (Edwards, 1865)
Ochlodes sylvanoides bonnevilla Scott, 1981 (Nevada) – Bonneville skipper
Ochlodes sylvanoides orecoasta Scott, 1981 (Oregon) – Oregon coast skipper
Ochlodes sylvanoides santacruza Scott, 1981 (northern California)
Ochlodes sylvanoides omnigena Austin, 1998 (Nevada, Great Basin)
Ochlodes sylvanoides catalina Emmel & Emmel, 1998

References

Ochlodes
Butterflies described in 1852